David Bruce DD (20 June 1824 – 15 December 1911) was a Scots-born New Zealand Presbyterian minister and journalist who spent his final years in Australia.

Life

He was born in Cramond, near Edinburgh on 20 June 1824 to David Bruce, a carpenter and farmer, and his wife, Margaret Robertson. The family moved to Aberdalgie in Perthshire soon afterwards. He was educated at Davidson's Classical Academy in Perth, then studied  at Edinburgh University graduating MA in 1847 then studying Divinity at New College, Edinburgh.

He was licensed to preach by the Free Church of Scotland in 1851 and ordained in Aberdeen in January 1853. However, finding no employment, he boarded the SS Simlah, bound for Auckland in New Zealand, arriving there in June 1853. Here his Free Presbyterian parish covered all of North Auckland. In 1862 he began working for the Free Church Extension Programme, promoting the Free Church over the entire country. He was Moderator of the General Assembly for the North Island in 1866. He became involved in encouraging Scottish ministers to come to New Zealand to preach.

In 1872 he founded the New Zealand Presbyterian Magazine. From 1891 he was lead writer for The New Zealand Herald.

In 1889 he moved to New South Wales in Australia. He represented Crow's Nest Parish in Sydney from 1891 to 1911. He was Moderator of the General Assembly for the Presbyterian Church of New South Wales in 1897/98 and Moderator for the Presbyterian Church of Australia 1903/04.

He died on 15 December 1911 at Killara in North Sydney.

Family

His younger brother was the churchman and theologian Alexander Balmain Bruce.

In Auckland in 1859, Bruce married Mary Alexander Sinclair, daughter of John Sinclair, of Glasgow, and niece of Andrew Sinclair, second Colonial Secretary of New Zealand. Her sister, Agnes, was the wife of the lawyer, judge, and politician Thomas Gillies. She died in Scotland in 1870. They had three sons and four daughters. Their eldest daughter, Agnes ("Essie") married the physician and writer Sir H. E. B. Bruce-Porter;
third daughter, Jessie Sinclair Bruce, married the politician, social reformer and medical practitioner Richard Arthur. The youngest daughter, Mary Alexander Sinclair Bruce (d. 1954), married Frederick Smythe Willis, J.P., sometime mayor of Willoughby, New South Wales and a founder member (and first hon. treasurer) of the Corporation of Accountants of Australia.

References

1824 births
1911 deaths
Clergy from Edinburgh
Alumni of the University of Edinburgh
New Zealand journalists
Scottish emigrants to New Zealand
New Zealand Presbyterian ministers